Elle Woods is the protagonist of Amanda Brown's 2001 novel Legally Blonde and the 2001 film of the same name as well as the 2003 sequel, Legally Blonde 2: Red, White and Blonde. Woods is also the protagonist of the 2007 Broadway adaptation of the film.

In pop culture 
Elle Woods first appeared as the protagonist of Legally Blonde, a novel by Amanda Brown. Later, Woods was portrayed by Reese Witherspoon in the films Legally Blonde (2001) and Legally Blonde 2: Red, White and Blonde (2003). The character was then portrayed in a Broadway musical adaptation of the first film, Legally Blonde - The Musical. Elle Woods is also the basis of a series of young adult fiction novels by Natalie Standiford. The character is mentioned but not seen in a 2009 direct-to-video sequel, Legally Blondes, which portrays the adventures of her twin British cousins. In 2018 Ariana Grande referenced Elle in several scenes of her "Thank U, Next" music video.

Legally Blonde films 
Entertainment Weekly put Elle Woods on its end-of-the-decade "best-of" list, saying, "She's blonde, bubbly and carries a tiny Chihuahua. But despite the inevitable Paris Hilton comparisons, Reese Witherspoon's Legally Blonde dynamo managed to be taken seriously. Case closed!"

Broadway adaptation 
Woods has been portrayed by eleven different actresses in different stagings of Legally Blonde - The Musical: Gabby Cinque, Olivia Mezzerina, Bailey Hanks, Sayaka Kanda, Barbara Obermeier and in the West End by Sheridan Smith (who was later replaced by her Legally Blonde co-star Susan McFadden). From July 2011 Carley Stenson took over the role of Elle Woods with Susan McFadden leaving the show.

Background
In the film, Legally Blonde, Elle Woods is a sorority sister living at the Delta Nu House at the fictional California University Los Angeles (CULA) (UCLA in the musical) where she studies in Fashion Merchandising and maintains a 4.0 GPA. Woods' boyfriend, Warner Huntington III, the son of a U.S. congressman, breaks up with her the night she expects him to propose, claiming that he needs "to marry a Jackie, not a Marilyn." Warner is bound for Harvard Law School, and Woods becomes determined to gain admittance to the school to win him back. Once at Harvard, Woods learns that Warner has a new fiancée, Vivian Kensington, who is a member of the same country club as Warner's family. Woods is able to exonerate a sorority sister accused of murder, and decides she does not need Warner. In the film's conclusion, Woods gives the commencement address to the law school class after proving herself and earning the respect of her peers, and beginning a relationship with Emmett Richmond. 

In the sequel to the original film, Elle is in the middle of planning her wedding while in line for a promotion at work. She decides to track down the birth mother of her beloved dog, Bruiser, and discovers that she is being used for animal testing. After getting fired for trying to bring up the testing facility, Elle goes to work on Capitol Hill, seeking to advance animal rights. She begins the film with naïve expectations about the motivations of members of Congress, and although these expectations are dashed, she perseveres and succeeds in the passage of the desired animal rights legislation. At the end of the movie, she marries Emmett in Washington, D.C., and is seen looking at the White House when Emmett asks her where she wants to live.

Further reading
 Rodericks, Elizabeth S. "Practical Femininity: The Student Development of Legally Blonde’s Elle Woods." The Graduate Review 7, no. 1 (2022): 24-29.
 Wierzbicki, Krysta. "Elle Woods Had It Right All Along: A Short List for Success in the Workplace." Building Your Best Chemistry Career Volume 2: Corporate Perspectives. American Chemical Society, 2020. 89-94.

References

External links
 Interview with Carley Stenson - Elle Woods

Characters in American novels of the 21st century
Comedy film characters
Female characters in literature
Female characters in film
Fictional beauty queens
Fictional characters from Los Angeles
Fictional feminists and women's rights activists
Fictional Harvard University people
Fictional American lawyers
Fictional models
Literary characters introduced in 2001
Reese Witherspoon
Legally Blonde (franchise)
Fictional vegan and vegetarian characters
Female characters in musical theatre
Fictional female lawyers